Pick and Shovel, also known as The Miner, is a 1923 silent comedy film starring Stan Laurel.

Cast
 Stan Laurel - Miner
 James Finlayson - The foreman
Katherine Grant - His daughter
George Rowe - Miner
 Sammy Brooks - Miner
William Gillespie - The boss

See also
 List of American films of 1923

References

External links

1923 films
American silent short films
American black-and-white films
1923 comedy films
1923 short films
Films directed by George Jeske
Silent American comedy films
American comedy short films
1920s American films